David John Delwyn Williams (born 1 November 1938) is a British former Conservative Party politician and solicitor.

Early life
He was educated at Welshpool High School and the University College of Wales, Aberystwyth, where he obtained an LL.B. degree. He subsequently qualified as a solicitor.

Political career
Having previously fought it unsuccessfully in 1970 United Kingdom general election, he was elected Member of Parliament for the traditionally Liberal seat of Montgomeryshire in 1979, ousting Emlyn Hooson by a majority of 1,593 votes, but lost the seat by 668 votes after one term to the Liberal Alex Carlile in 1983.

He stood in a by-election to Powys County Council in 2007 in the Welshpool, Gungrog ward as an Independent but came third behind the Liberal Democrat candidate and another Independent.

In the campaign for the 2015 General Election he publicly declared his support for the United Kingdom Independence Party, citing in at least one newspaper letter dissatisfaction with the Prime Ministerial record of David Cameron, and objection to proposals by the Conservatives to extend tax raising powers to the Welsh Assembly.

In September 2016 he criticised Wales Boundary Commission proposals that would partition the present Montgomeryshire UK Parliament constituency between three neighbouring seats, claiming it would "create a bureaucratic nightmare" of three MPs representing the existing shire county area. He suggested instead the whole seat be amalgamated with the neighbouring Brecon and Radnorshire on grounds of their common administration under Powys County Council.

Personal life

His current (2015) home is in Guilsfield, Montgomeryshire.

References 

Times Guide to the House of Commons 1983

External links 
 

1938 births
Living people
Conservative Party (UK) MPs for Welsh constituencies
UK MPs 1979–1983
UK Independence Party people